The Rolling Stones' 1965 4th European Tour was a concert tour by the band. The tour commenced on September 11 and concluded on September 17, 1965.

The Rolling Stones
Mick Jagger - lead vocals, harmonica, percussion
Keith Richards - guitar, backing vocals
Brian Jones - guitar, harmonica, backing vocals
Bill Wyman - bass guitar, backing vocals
Charlie Watts - drums

Tour set list
Songs performed include:
Everybody Needs Somebody To Love
Pain In My Heart
Around and Around
Time Is On My Side
I'm Moving On
The Last Time
(I Can't Get No) Satisfaction
I'm Alright

Tour dates

References
 Carr, Roy.  The Rolling Stones: An Illustrated Record.  Harmony Books, 1976.  

The Rolling Stones concert tours
1965 concert tours
1965 in Europe
Concert tours of Europe